The chordae tendineae (tendinous cords), colloquially known as the heart strings, are inelastic cords of fibrous connective tissue that connect the papillary muscles to the tricuspid valve and the mitral valve in the heart.

Structure
The chordae tendineae connect the atrioventricular valves (tricuspid and mitral), to the papillary muscles within the ventricles. Multiple chordae tendineae attach to each leaflet or cusp of the valves. Chordae tendineae contain elastin in a delicate structure notably at their periphery.

Tendon of Todaro
The tendon of Todaro is a continuation of the Eustachian valve of the inferior vena cava and the valve of the coronary sinus. Along with the opening of the coronary sinus and the septal cusp of the tricuspid valve, it makes up Koch's triangle. The apex of Koch's triangle is the location of the atrioventricular node.

Function

During atrial systole, blood flows from the atria to the ventricles down the pressure gradient. Chordae tendineae are relaxed because the atrioventricular valves are forced open.

When the ventricles of the heart contract in ventricular systole, the increased blood pressures in both chambers push the AV valves to close simultaneously, preventing backflow of blood into the atria. Since the blood pressure in atria is much lower than that in the ventricles, the flaps attempt to evert to the low pressure regions. The chordae tendineae prevent this prolapse by becoming tense, which pulls on the flaps, holding them in closed position.

Clinical significance

Ruptured chordae tendineae 
Valvular heart disease can lead to ruptured chordae tendineae. This can cause severe mitral insufficiency.

Parachute mitral valve 
Parachute mitral valve occurs when all the chordae tendineae of the mitral valve attach to a single papillary muscle. This causes mitral valve stenosis at an early age. It is a rare congenital heart defect. Although it often causes mitral insufficiency, it may not present any symptoms.

Additional images

See also

 Cardiac cycle

References

Cardiac anatomy